Salt or Sult is a block in Almora district, Uttarakhand, India. It is also known as Kumaun Ki Bardoli, a name given to it by Mahatma Gandhi when he visited Almora in 1929. Khumar is a village located in Salt which has a Martyr Monument.

Villages
Villages in the Sult subdistrict:

References

Almora district
Tehsils of India